NoorAlhussein Dheyaa (()) (born 2 July 2006 in Iraq) is an Iraqi footballer who plays as a Forward for the Iraq under-17 national team and Shahr Khodro F.C., He is high school student in iran.

International team 
In March 2022, the management of the Iraq national under-17 football team summoned the player NoorAlhussein Dheyaa for the 2023 Asian Youth Cup that will held in Uzbekistan.

Transfers 
in 2017,He joined his first club Fafa Club, and continued with the club for one season only, and then moved to Shahr Khodro Club, which started with them in the youth team and after that was promoted  to the first team.

References

External links 
 Instagram
 Telegram

2006 births
Living people
Iraqi footballers
Association football forwards
Shahr Khodro F.C. players